Koen Gijsbers (born 22 August 1958) is a former Dutch sprinter and middle-distance runner. He competed in the men's 400 metres at the 1980 Summer Olympics.

Statistics

Personal bests
Source:

Indoor

Outdoor

Season's best
Source:

Indoor

Outdoor

References

1958 births
Living people
Athletes (track and field) at the 1980 Summer Olympics
Dutch male sprinters
Olympic athletes of the Netherlands
Place of birth missing (living people)
Medalists at the 1979 Summer Universiade
Universiade silver medalists for the Netherlands
Universiade medalists in athletics (track and field)
20th-century Dutch people
21st-century Dutch people